The Umba sapphire is a unique type of sapphire discovered in 1962 in the Gerevi Hills, north of the Umba River in the Umba Valley of Tanzania. Umba sapphires exhibit coloration not common to sapphires found in other parts of the world, and are recovered from the alluvial deposits of the Umba River. 

, the Tanzanian government prohibits export of these sapphires.

References

African Journals Online listing
USGS: The Mineral Industry of Tanzania

Corundum gemstones
Mining in Tanzania
Non-tariff barriers to trade